The Irish Socialist Republican Party was a small, but pivotal Irish political party founded in 1896 by James Connolly. Its aim was to establish an Irish workers' republic. The party split in 1904 following months of internal political rows.

History
The party was small throughout its existence. According to the ISRP historian Lynch, the party never had more than 80 active members. Upon its founding one journalist commented that the party had more syllables than members. The party emerged out of the Dublin Socialist Club when a motion was put forward at Pierce Ryan's pub on Thomas Street, Dublin to form 
a party. Connolly and six others were present at inaugural meeting.

Nevertheless, the ISRP is regarded by many Irish historians as a party of seminal importance in the early history of Irish socialism and republicanism. It is often described as the first socialist and republican party in Ireland, and the first organisation to espouse the ideology of socialist republicanism on the island.  During its lifespan it only had one really active branch, the Dublin one. There were several attempts to create branches in Cork, Belfast, Limerick, Naas, and even in northern England but they never came to much. The party established links with feminist and revolutionary Maud Gonne who approved of the party.

The party produced the first regular socialist paper in Ireland, the Workers' Republic, ran candidates in local elections, represented Ireland at the Second International, and agitated over issues such as the Boer War and the 1798 commemorations. Politically the ISRP was before its time, putting the call for an independent "Republic" at the centre of its propaganda before Sinn Féin or others had done so.

A public meeting held by the party is described in Irish socialist playwright Sean O'Casey's autobiography Drums under the Window.

Connolly who was the full-time paid organiser for the party subsequently left Ireland for the United States in 1903 following internal conflict; in fact it seems to have been a combination of the petty infighting and his own poverty that caused Connolly to abandon Ireland (he returned in 1910). Connolly had clashed with the party's other leading light, E. W. Stewart, over trade union and electoral strategy.  A small number of members around Stewart established an anti-Connolly micro organisation called the Irish Socialist Labour Party.  In 1904, this merged with the remains of the ISRP to form the Socialist Party of Ireland.

References

Further reading
 David Lynch, Radical Politics in Modern Ireland: A History of the Irish Socialist Republican Party (ISRP) 1896-1904, (Dublin: Irish Academic Press 2005) 
 Mike Milotte, Communism in Modern Ireland: The Pursuit of the Workers' Republic since 1916, (Dublin 1984)
 Charles Townshend, Easter 1916: The Irish Rebellion (London 2006)
 Charles Townshend, The Republic:  The Fight For Irish Independence (London 2013)
 Dictionary of Irish Biography (Dublin 2007)

External links
A 'Political Studies Review' article on the ISRP
The text of the 1896 political programme of the ISRP
Review of book about ISRP
Interview with Connolly scholars on the legacy of Connolly and the ISRP on the 90th anniversary of the 1916 Rising. Published in the Irish Echo (US)
Scottish Left Review on ISRP study
English magazine review of study of ISRP
Scottish magazine review of a study of the ISRP 
Critical look at the ISRP in the Socialist Standard (UK)
History Ireland magazine claims that one George Spain became leader of the ISRP following Connolly's departure to the United States in late 1903, a claim not made in David Lynch's 2005 study of the party.
The ISRP and the Dewsbury Election (29 March 1902)
Picture of the ISRP in Phoenix Park Dublin in 1901

1896 establishments in Ireland
1904 disestablishments in Ireland
Anti-imperialist organizations
Communist parties in Ireland
Defunct communist parties
Defunct political parties in Ireland
Defunct socialist parties in Europe
Irish republican parties
Marxist parties in Ireland
Political parties disestablished in 1904
Political parties established in 1896
Political parties in pre-partition Ireland